Pembroke College in Brown University was the coordinate women's college for Brown University in Providence, Rhode Island. It was founded in 1891 and merged into Brown in 1971.

Founding and early history

The founding of the Women's College Adjunct to Brown University in October 1891, later renamed the Women's College in Connection with Brown University, provided an organizational structure to allow women to attend that institution; Brown College remained as the men's college. The system resembled those at Columbia University (Columbia College for men, Barnard College for women) and Harvard University (Harvard College for men, Radcliffe College for women).

Brown's single-sex status had first been challenged in April 1874, when the university received an application from a woman. The Advisory and Executive Committee decided that admitting women at the time was not a good proposal, but they continued to revisit the matter annually until 1888. Subsequent discussions led to the creation of the Women's College on October 1, 1891.

The first women students were: Maude Bonner, Clara Comstock, Nettie Goodale Murdoch, Elizabeth Peckham, Anne T. Weeden, and Mary Emma Woolley. Their classes were held at a grammar school that had once been associated with Brown. After the boys went home at two o’clock, the women arrived to learn from their professors in a classroom on the second floor. The school had no lights, so the women worked until the daylight was too dim to read by. One of the major advocates for admitting women to Brown University, Sarah Doyle, raised $75,000 to build the first permanent building for Brown's new female students; named Pembroke Hall, this structure would be renamed Pembroke College in 1928.

Official recognition of the college as a body of the university came in 1896. The college received its own faculty in 1903. By 1910, 40% of students were from outside Rhode Island.

Deans of Pembroke College

Later history and coeducation

In 1928, the Women's College was renamed "Pembroke College in Brown University" in honor of Pembroke College at the University of Cambridge in England. Roger Williams, one of the founders of Rhode Island, was an alumnus of Cambridge's Pembroke. Due to this, one of the buildings on Brown's campus had been named "Pembroke Hall." This was the building on the Brown campus where most "Pembrokers," as Women's College students were already known, attended classes. The Women's College had also already been using the coat of arms of Cambridge's Pembroke for formal decoration on programs and pins.

In 1931 Pembroke College began a nursing program with the Rhode Island Hospital Training School for Nurses to train women to teach in nursing school.

The "coordinate" status of Pembroke College was valued because it allowed women to take courses with Brown students yet still experience the characteristics of single-sex education. This included a separate student government, separate newspaper and separate social clubs.

In 1969, students from Pembroke and Brown began living in shared dormitories. Since women students had been attending classes and participating in extracurricular activities at Brown for some time, the Advisory and Executive Council proposed a merger between the colleges. On July 1, 1971, the merger became official, with all undergraduate students being admitted to and attending the same college.

In 1981, the Pembroke Center for Teaching and Research on Women was established at Brown, billing itself as a "center for interdisciplinary research on gender and society." Its mission also includes the preservation of the history of women at Brown. Affiliated with the Sarah Doyle Women's Center, it is home to the university's Gender Studies program and publishes the academic journal differences: A Journal of Feminist Cultural Studies. The Pembroke Center has also sponsored the digitization of the Pembroke College newspaper "The Pembroke Record" which can be accessed on line.

Although Brown became a fully coeducational institution with the merger, the history of women at Brown was still evolving. On September 3, 1991, Jill Ker Conway, the president of the all-female Smith College, delivered the opening convocation address to the student body in celebration of Brown's 100 years of women on campus. A four-day symposium was also held in October of that year in order to discuss women's issues, with President of Ireland Mary Robinson delivering the keynote address.

At the time of the merger, only 25% of the undergraduate students were women. By the 2005-2006 academic year, 51% of students at Brown University were female.

Notable alumnae

The first graduates were Mary Emma Woolley and Anne Tillinghast Weeden in 1894. In early graduation programs, the names of the female graduates were listed in a special section below those of men. This list is in alphabetical order, by surname.

 Elinor B. Bachrach (A.B. 1965) – Senior Fiscal Advisor, United States Agency for International Development (USAID)
 Charlotta Bass (did not graduate) – African-American educator and civil rights activist known as editor and publisher of the California Eagle. She was the Progressive Party's nominee for vice president in the 1952 presidential election, which makes her the first Black woman nominated for one of the nation's two highest offices.
 Haiganush R. Bedrosian (A.B. 1965) –  Chief Justice of the Rhode Island Family Court (2010–2016) 
 Susan Bennett (A.B. 1971) – voice actress best known as the voice of Apple Inc.'s Siri
 Dana Buchman Farber (A.B. 1973) – fashion designer and activist
 Susan Cheever (A.B. 1965) – PEN New England Award-winning author and columnist
 Kitty Chen (A.B. 1966) – playwright and actress
 Lyn Crost (A.B 1938) – World War II correspondent and author
 Alice Drummond (A.B. 1950) – Tony Award-nominated actress
 Katherine G. Farley (A.B. 1971) – Chairwoman, Lincoln Center for the Performing Arts (2010–present)
 Kathryn S. Fuller (A.B. 1967) – Chair, The Ford Foundation (2004–2010)
 Laura Geller (A.B. 1971) – Senior Rabbi Emerita, Temple Emanuel
 Lillian Moller Gilbreth (Ph.D. 1915) – psychologist, industrial engineer, consultant, and educator
 Robin Green (A.B. 1967) – Primetime Emmy Award-winning writer and producer
 Penelope Hartland-Thunberg (A.B. 1940, PhD Hon.'66) – Commissioner of the United States Tariff Commission (1965–1969); Federal Woman's Award recipient
 Marianne Hirsch (A.B. 1970, Ph.D. 1975) – William Peterfield Trent Professor of English and Comparative Literature, Columbia University; Professor, Institute for Research on Women, Gender, and Sexuality
 Constance Hunting (A.B. 1947) – poet and publisher
 Ruth Hussey (A.B. 1936) – Academy Award-nominated actress best known for her performance in The Philadelphia Story
 Judith Jacobson (A.B. 1964) – Associate Professor of Clinical Epidemiology, Columbia University Mailman School of Public Health
 Helen Johns (A.B. 1936) – retired competition swimmer, Olympic champion, and former world record-holder
 Martha Sharp Joukowsky (A.B. 1958) – Professor of Archaeology, Brown University; co-founder, Brown's Joukowsky Institute for Archaeology and the Ancient World; President, Archaeological Institute of America (1989–1993) 
 Lois Lowry (1958, LITTD '14Hon) – Newbery Medal-winning author best known for The Giver
 Linda Mason Aminoff (A.B. 1964) – Emmy Award-winning producer; Senior Vice President, CBS News (2005–2013)
 Martha K. Matzke (A.B. 1966) – co-founder and former executive editor, Education Week  
 Emily Arnold McCully (A.B. 1961, LITTD 2002Hon) – Caldecott Medal-winning children's author and illustrator best known for Mirette on the High Wire
  Kristie Miller (A.B. 1966) – author of books on women and politics best known for C-SPAN television series First Ladies: Influence & Image
  Catharine Theimer Nepomnyashchy (A.B. 1973, A.M. 1973) – Chair, Barnard College Slavic Department
 Albina Osipowich (A.B. 1933) – retired competition swimmer, Olympic champion, and former world record-holder
 Maureen Paley (A.B. 1975) – contemporary art gallery owner
 Jane Pincus (A.B. 1959) – author best known for Our Bodies, Ourselves
 Eliza Greene Metcalf Radeke (A.B. 1914) – President, Rhode Island School of Design (1913–1931)
 Vicki Robin (A.B. 1967) – author best known for Your Money or Your Life
 Marilynne Robinson (A.B. 1966) – Pulitzer Prize-winning author
 Susan Salms-Moss (A.B. 1967) – opera soprano singer and translator
 Martha Sharp-Cogan (A.B. 1926) – philanthropist named Righteous Among the Nations for helping hundreds of Jews escape the Holocaust
 Leah Sprague (A.B. 1966) – Judge, Newburyport Massachusetts District Court 
 Wendy Strothman (A.B. 1972, LHD 2008) – former publisher at Beacon Press and Houghton Mifflin  
 Anna Canada Swain (A.B. 1911) – christian missionary and author known as Brown's first female trustee
 Gwyneth Walker (A.B. 1968) – composer and music educator
 Betsy West (A.B. 1973) – video journalist, filmmaker and Primetime Emmy Award-winning producer; Senior Vice President, CBS News (1998–2005)
 JoBeth Williams (A.B. 1970) – actress and Academy Award-nominated filmmaker
 Mary Emma Woolley (A.B. 1894, M.A. 1895) – educator, peace and women's suffrage activist; President, Mount Holyoke College (1900–1937)
 Janet Yellen (A.B. 1967) – 78th U.S. Secretary of the Treasury (2021–present); 15th Chair of the Federal Reserve (2014–2018); 18th Chair of the Council of Economic Advisers (1997–1999)

References

Citations

General sources 
 " Brown University: At a Glance." The College Board. 2006.
 "Pembroke Center for Teaching and Research on Women." July 24, 2001. National Council for Research on Women.
 "Pembroke Center: About Us". Pembroke Center for Teaching and Research on Women.

Further reading
 Kaufman, Polly Welts. The Search for Equity: Women at Brown University, 1891–1991. Brown University Press, Providence, Rhode Island, 1991.
 Mitchell, Martha. "Pembroke College". Encyclopedia Brunoniana. 1993. Providence, RI: Brown University Library.
 Mitchell, Martha. "Seal". Encyclopedia Brunoniana. 1993. Providence, RI: Brown University Library.
 Pembroke Club of Providence, "This Was Pembroke" (brochure), Providence R.I., August 2002.

External links

 Pembroke Center for Teaching and Research on Women
 Pembroke College - Encyclopedia Brunoniana
 Brown University at the ''Encyclopædia Britannica'

Educational institutions established in 1891
Brown University
Defunct private universities and colleges in Rhode Island
Embedded educational institutions
Buildings and structures in Providence, Rhode Island
Education in Providence, Rhode Island
Educational institutions disestablished in 1971
1891 establishments in Rhode Island
Liberal arts colleges in Rhode Island